This article presents a list of the historical events and publications of Australian literature during 1947.

Events 

 The Grace Leven Prize for Poetry, worth £50, is awarded for the first time to Pacific Sea by Nan McDonald.

Books 

 Jon Cleary – You Can't See 'Round Corners
 Erle Cox – The Missing Angel
 M. Barnard Eldershaw – Tomorrow and Tomorrow
 Miles Franklin – The Thorny Rose
 Arthur Gask – The Dark Mill Stream
 Catherine Gaskin – With Every Year
 Ion L. Idriess – Isles of Despair
 Norman Lindsay – Halfway to Anywhere
 Vance Palmer – Cyclone
 Nevil Shute – The Chequer Board

Short stories 

 Myra Morris – The Township
 Judah Waten – "To a Country Town"

Children's and Young Adult fiction 

 Ruth C. Williams – Timothy Tatters

Poetry 

 David Campbell – "Small-Town Gladys"
 Victor Daley – Creeve Roe : Poetry
 Rosemary Dobson – "Country Press"
 R. D. Fitzgerald – "Fifth Day"
 A. D. Hope – "Conquistador"
 Nancy Keesing – "Detective Story"
 Nan McDonald – Pacific Sea
 John Shaw Neilson – Unpublished Poems of John Shaw Neilson
 Will H. Ogilvie – "Harry Morant"
 Elizabeth Riddell – "A Train in the Night"
 Roland Robinson – "Drifting Dug-Out"
 Judith Wright
 "The Bull"
 "The Cycads"

Drama 

 Vance Palmer – Hail Tomorrow
 Douglas Stewart – Shipwreck
 Patrick White – The Ham Funeral

Awards and honours

Note: these awards were presented in the year in question.

Literary

Children's and Young Adult

Poetry

Births 

A list, ordered by date of birth (and, if the date is either unspecified or repeated, ordered alphabetically by surname) of births in 1947 of Australian literary figures, authors of written works or literature-related individuals follows, including year of death.

 15 January – Richard Harland, novelist
 21 March – Terry Dowling, novelist and short story writer
 13 April – Amanda Lohrey, novelist
 4 May
 Marele Day, novelist
 Peter Kocan, author and poet
 13 July – David Marr, journalist and biographer
 23 September – Gary Crew, novelist
 30 October – Gary Catalano, poet and art critic (died 2002)
 12 November – Martin Johnston, novelist and poet (died 1990)

Unknown date
 Eric Beach, poet and playwright
 Michael Dugan, poet (died 2006)
 Jacqueline Kent, writer and biographer
 Rhyll McMaster, novelist
 Bruce Pascoe, novelist
 Graham Rowlands, poet
 Arnold Zable, novelist

Deaths 

A list, ordered by date of death (and, if the date is either unspecified or repeated, ordered alphabetically by surname) of deaths in 1947 of Australian literary figures, authors of written works or literature-related individuals follows, including year of birth.

 12 February – Douglas Sladen, poet and biographer (born 1856)
 19 July – Lennie Lower, journalist and novelist (born 1903)
 18 October – R. H. Croll, poet and writer (born 1869)
 1 November – Tilly Aston, blind writer and teacher (born 1873)

See also 
 1947 in poetry
 List of years in literature
 List of years in Australian literature
 1947 in literature
 1946 in Australian literature
1947 in Australia
1948 in Australian literature

References

Literature
Australian literature by year
20th-century Australian literature
1947 in literature